Calcium channel, voltage-dependent, T type, alpha 1H subunit, also known as CACNA1H, is a protein which in humans is encoded by the CACNA1H gene.

Function 

This gene encodes Cav3.2, a T-type member of the α1 subunit family, a protein in the voltage-dependent calcium channel complex. Calcium channels mediate the influx of calcium ions into the cell upon membrane polarization and consist of a complex of α1, α2δ, β, and γ subunits in a 1:1:1:1 ratio. The α1 subunit has 24 transmembrane segments and forms the pore through which ions pass into the cell. There are multiple isoforms of each of the proteins in the complex, either encoded by different genes or the result of alternative splicing of transcripts. Alternate transcriptional splice variants, encoding different isoforms, have been characterized for the gene described here.

Clinical significance 

Studies suggest certain mutations in this gene lead to childhood absence epilepsy (CAE). Variants of Cav3.2 with increased channel activity contribute to susceptibility to idiopathic generalized epilepsy (IGE), but are not sufficient to induce epilepsy on their own.  The SFARIgene database lists CACNA1H with an autism score of 2.1, indicating a candidate causal relationship with autism.

See also
 T-type calcium channel

References

External links

Further reading

Ion channels
Integral membrane proteins